Narendra Chanchal (16 October 1940 – 22 January 2021) was an Indian singer who specialized in religious songs and hymns. Besides several bhajans, Chanchal had also sung songs in Hindi films as well. He was the singer of many iconic bhajans & Hindi film songs in history.

Some of the popular devotional songs sung by Narinder Chanchal include: Chalo Bulawa Aaya Hai, Tune Mujhe Bulaya Sherawaliye, Ambe Tu Hai Jagadambe Kali, Hanuman Chalisa, Sankat Mochan Naam Tiharo, Ram Se Bada Ram Ka Naam among others.

Personal life
Chanchal was born in a religious Punjabi Hindu family in Namak Mandi, Amritsar on 16 October 1940.
He grew up in a religious atmosphere which inspired him to start singing bhajans and aartis. He married Namrata Chanchal in 1976. He has 1 daughter named Kapila Puri married to Hemant Puri & 2 Sons named Siddharth Chanchal & Mohit Chanchal. His Grandchildren are Aadya, Hemang, Arya, Kyra.

Career
After years of struggle, Chanchal sang a Bollywood song Beshak Mandir Masjid for the 1973 film Bobby and won Filmfare Best Male Playback Award. He made a mark in the world of devotional songs. He also earned honorary citizenship of the US state of Georgia.

Chanchal has released a biography called Midnight Singer which narrates his life, struggles and hardships leading to achievements. He visited Katra Vaishno Devi every year on 29 December and performed on the last day of the year.

Death
Chanchal died at age 80 on 22 January 2021 at Apollo Hospital in New Delhi, due to age-related illness.

Discography

Special Appearance
Devotional Singer Special Appearance in Zee Tv , Television Serial 12/24 Karol Bagh for Jagdamba,Maa Ambe "JAGRAATA"  (Maha Episode No 30), (Episode No 31)

References

External links

 

1940 births
2021 deaths
Filmfare Awards winners
Punjabi people
Punjabi Hindus
Musicians from Amritsar
Singers from Punjab, India
20th-century Indian singers
20th-century Indian male singers
Bollywood playback singers
Indian male playback singers